The Bourg-en-Bresse Congress was the tenth national congress of the French Socialist Party (Parti socialiste or PS). It took place from 28 to 30 October 1983.

Results

Lionel Jospin was re-elected as First Secretary.

References

Congresses of the Socialist Party (France)
1983 in France
1983 in politics
1983 conferences